The 1803 United States Senate election in Massachusetts was held in February 1803.

Incumbent Senator Jonathan Mason, who had been elected to fill the unexpired term of Benjamin Goodhue, did not run for a full term in office. The Massachusetts General Court deliberated and elected State Senator and former diplomat John Quincy Adams, son of former President John Adams, on the fourth ballot.

Background
Benjamin Goodhue was elected Senator from Massachusetts in 1796. However, he resigned and retired from politics in 1800. In his place, the legislature elected State Senator Jonathan Mason. When Mason's term expired in 1803, he declined to stand for re-election.

Election

First ballot

Second

Third

Fourth

Senate ballot
The Senate ratified the choice of Adams on a single unanimous ballot.

Aftermath
Adams served one term in the Senate, though he would resign months early after the Federalist legislature prematurely voted not to award him a second term. Adams quickly drifted away from the Federalist Party, partly over his differences with Pickering.

After joining the Democratic-Republicans, he would go on to serve as Secretary of State and later as President of the United States from 1825 to 1829.

References

1803
Massachusetts
United States Senate
John Quincy Adams